The Dark Side of Tomorrow is a 1970 American exploitation film about two bored suburban housewives who begin an affair while their husbands are away on business. Things take a turn when one of them decides to becomes involved with a young man from their neighborhood. To one woman, the affair was just a fling. To the other, it was life changing.

It was re-released in 1975 as Just the Two of Us.

Cast
Elizabeth Plumb (as Elisabeth Plumb)-Denise Bentley
Alisa Courtney- Adria Madsen
John Aprea -Jim Jeffers
Marland Proctor -Casey
Wayne Want -David Madsen
Elizabeth Knowles (as Elizabeth Knowels)-Mona Klein
Jamie Cooper -Joe Bentley
Vince Romano -the waiter

Production
The film was financed by an Israeli investor who wanted an X-rated sex film. Director Barbara Peeters changed the storyline to center around a lesbian relationship. She feels the fact it was from a female director was significant. "If you are going to involve yourself in subjects that heretofore have been taboo, the first moves in that direction should be as close to reality as possible", she said.

See also
 List of American films of 1970

References

External links

1970s exploitation films
1970s English-language films
1970 LGBT-related films
1970 films
Lesbian-related films
American exploitation films
Films directed by Barbara Peeters
1970s American films